Luis Hernandez Olea (born March 11, 1984, in Guadalajara, Mexico) is a Mexican former competitive figure skater. He was a 6-time Mexican National champion. Representing Mexico at 4 World Championships. In 2008, he placed 15th at the Four Continents Championships. Highest finish ever by a male skater from Mexico. He previously competed at the United States Figure Skating Championships, placing 7th as a novice in 2002 and 11th in 2003. He was formerly coached by Frank Carroll.

Competitive highlights

 WD = Withdrew; QR = Qualifying Round

References

External links
 

Mexican male single skaters
Sportspeople from Guadalajara, Jalisco
1984 births
Living people